Halkin may refer to:
The namesake of the Baronetcy of Halkin
Halkin (surname)
 Belarusian and Ukrainian equivalents of the Russian surname Galkin
The Halkin,  hotel in London, England
Halkin Castle, or Halkyn Castle, Flintshire, Wales

See also
Halkyn